The MV Lucky Star was a ferry previously operated by TransEuropa Ferries between 1999 and April 2013 as MV Larkspur. After TEF went bankrupt in April 2013 the ship has remained laid up in Ostend in Belgium. She was sold in December 2013 to an unknown buyer and then sold again to Oilchart, a local bunkering company, for more than E400K. Her name was then shortened to Larks. She briefly served with the Greek ferry operator Egnatia Seaways but after financial issue from within Egnatia she was laid up and was renamed Lucky Star on the 01/09/2014 and was registered to Velenio Shipping Co Ltd, Athens, Greece at the same time of her renaming.

History
Launched as the Gedser she served between Gedser (Denmark) and Travemunde (Germany) from 1976 until 1986 when she was acquired by Sally Line and she was renamed the Viking 2 where she entered service for Sally Line between Ramsgate (UK) and Dunkerque (France), in 1988 she was renamed the Sally Sky and then in 1997 the Eurotraveller where she entered service for Sally Direct.

In 1999 she was acquired by TransEuropa Ferries and she entered service between Ramsgate and Ostend as the Larkspur, later being joined by the Gardenia and Begonia in 2002, then by the Ostend Spirit (1) in 2010 and the Ostend Spirit (2) in 2013, she was laid up in 2013 with what was believed to be engine problems but was to remain laid up after TransEuropa filed for Bankruptcy in April 2013. In December 2013 the Larkspur was put up for sale in a public auction for E400k, but was then sold to Oilchart which is a local bunkering company for more than E400K and remained in Ostend, she was renamed in 2014 to just simply Larks.

In September 2016 she was sold to Turkey for scrap.

References

Ferries
1976 ships